Manfred von Richthofen was a fighter pilot with the German Air Force during World War I

Manfred von Richthofen may also refer to:

 Manfred von Richthofen (general), a German General der Kavallerie (General of the Cavalry) during World War I
 Manfred von Richthofen (sports official), a German hockey player and coach
 Manfred Albert von Richthofen, killed in a crime with the participation of his own daughter